The Cox Family is an American country/bluegrass music group from Cotton Valley in Webster Parish in northwestern Louisiana, United States.  The Cox Family can be heard on the O Brother, Where Art Thou? soundtrack. Their 1994 collaboration with Alison Krauss, I Know Who Holds Tomorrow, won the 1995 Grammy Award for Best Southern, Country or Bluegrass Gospel Album. They were nominated for another Grammy for their album Beyond the City. They may also be heard on the Traveller (1997) motion picture soundtrack with their renditions of the Carter Family's "I'm Thinking Tonight of My Blue Eyes" and "Sweeter Than the Flowers". In 2015, they released Gone Like the Cotton, their first album for nearly 20 years.

Members
Evelyn Cox (born June 20, 1959) - guitar, vocals
Lynn Cox (born October 11, 1960) - bass, vocals
Sidney Cox (born July 21, 1965) - banjo, dobro, guitar, vocals
Suzanne Cox (born June 5, 1967) - mandolin, vocals
Willard Cox (born June 9, 1937 - November 4, 2019) - fiddle, vocals
Dennis Sunderman - bass

Discography

Albums

Singles

Music videos

References

External links
 Cox Family website
Cox Family biography on CMT Website

Family musical groups
Grammy Award winners
People from Cotton Valley, Louisiana